Megatushon Creek is a tributary of the Nahlin River, part of the Taku River watershed in northwest part of the province of British Columbia, Canada. Megatushon Creek's watershed's land cover is classified as 34.8% barren, 32.3% shrubland, 24.8% conifer forest, and small amounts of other cover.

Megatushon Creek is in the traditional territory of the Tlingit Taku River Tlingit First Nation and the Tahltan First Nation, of the Tahltan people.

Geography
The creek flows north, northwest, and east, first through Level Mountain's high and relatively barren lava plateau, then through rugged forested terrain, before emptying into the Nahlin River.

See also
List of British Columbia rivers

References

External links
 

Cassiar Land District
Level Mountain
Nahlin Plateau
Rivers of British Columbia
Stikine Country
Tahltan
Tlingit